Chrynów massacre was a massacre of Polish worshipers which took place in the Volhynian village of Chrynów, Gmina Grzybowica, Powiat Włodzimierz, Wołyń Voivodeship of the Second Polish Republic (Volyn Oblast since 1945, modern Грибовицька волость, Ukraine). It took place on Sunday, July 11, 1943, when the Ukrainian Insurgent Army (UPA) as well as armed deserters from the Ukrainian Auxiliary Police (formed by Nazi Germany), supported by local Ukrainian peasants, surrounded the local Roman-Catholic church where the Poles had gathered for a religious ceremony. The parish priest Jan Kotwicki was shot along with a group of women, when attempting to escape through the vestry. During the attack on the village Ukrainians murdered some 150 Poles. A week after these events all buildings in the village and the church were burned down to the ground, and the village ceased to exist.

References

1943 crimes in Poland
July 1943 events
Massacres of Poles in Volhynia
War crimes committed by the Ukrainian Insurgent Army
Ukrainian Auxiliary Police
Attacks on churches in Europe
Massacres in religious buildings and structures
Massacres in 1943
1943 murders in Europe